Mirza Tughai Bey, Tuhay Bey (Cyrillic: Тугай-бей) sometimes also spelled as  Togay Bey (died June 1651) was a notable military leader and politician of the Crimean Tatars.

Biography
Toğay descended from the Arğıns - one of noble Crimean families, and his full name is Arğın Doğan Toğay bey (Arhyn Dohan Tohai bei). "Bey" is actually a title, which he received on becoming the chief of Or Qapı (Perekop) sanjak, an important position in the Crimean Khanate, since the Isthmus of Perekop is the neck to Crimean Peninsula and was crucial to its defense.

Tuhay Bey became the bey of Or Qapı sometime between 1642 and 1644, an important position of the Crimean Khanate who was in charge of Or Qapı fortress - the gateway to the peninsula. By 1644 he had enough authority for the Khan of Crimea to entrust to him leadership of the major Tatar expedition against Poland. However, Tuhay Bey's army was intercepted by the Polish army under hetman Koniecpolski before reaching the densely populated regions of Ukraine and defeated in the First Battle of Okhmativ.

In 1648 he brought an army (estimated 6,000-20,000) to help Bohdan Khmelnytsky during the Cossack uprising against the Polish–Lithuanian Commonwealth. There he took part in several important battles and was eventually killed during the Battle of Berestechko.

He was portrayed in the Polish novel and film With Fire and Sword. In the film he was played by Daniel Olbrychski. Henryk Sienkiewicz made a character in his third novel "Pan Wołodyjowski" - Tuhay Bey's son - Azja. He was played in the film "Colonel Wolodyjowski" from 1969 by Daniel Olbrychski.

References

Bibliography
 Podhorodecki, L. Chanat krymski i jego stosunki z Polską w 15-18 w. Warsaw, 1987.
 Serczyk, W.A. Na płonącej Ukrainie. Dzieje Kozaczyzny 1648-1651. Warsaw, 1998.
 Holobutsky, V. Zaporizhian Cossackdom. "Vyshcha shkola". Kiev, 1994.  (http://litopys.org.ua/holob/hol.htm)

1651 deaths
Crimean Tatar politicians
Crimean Khanate
17th-century soldiers
17th-century births